Issues in retirement security refers to growing economic concerns and societal issues over the ability of individual workers and other individuals in society to have an economically secure retirement.

Main issues appear to arise from the general inability of maintaining the economic life-cycle model, that anticipates people to make proper savings during their working lives and eventually exhaust these resources in retirement in order to retain their existing consumption level.

Overview
the issues of economic security in retirement pertain to the following concerns.

 whether individuals are saving enough.
 whether existing government programs for retired individuals are sufficient to support the average person
 the decline in the existence of company-funded pensions for their employees.
 the question of whether workers are contributing enough to company retirement plans.
 the problem that the majority workers do not have a company retirement plan that they can contribute to.

Situation in USA 
One of the biggest issue in the current world and also in USA concerning retirement security is the inability to adequately save money for the retirement. Personal saving rate in U.S. is currently near half the level, that was 50 years ago. The rate has increased after the financial crisis in 2009, but still reaches only about 8% of net personal income. Approximately two thirds of Millennials do not save money for retirement at all and half of the American households with someone aged 55 years or more has the same problem. In addition, there is a significant demographic change coming in the next 30 years where the increment of people older than 65 years compared to working age population will be substantially greater. Longevity of the population in the United States is also emerging as a crucial factor for future retirement security, average life expectancy in 2017 of males and females at the age of 65 has increased since 1940 by 6 and 7 years to 84 and 87. This upward trend is expected to rise further.

Millennials (born between 1981 and 1991) are among the most endangered generations. About a one fifth of them are already worried about their retirement security and about a half fear they will not be able to retire when they plan to. According to certain financial experts, they are recommended to save 15 to 22 percent of their income in order to keep their lifestyle standards during retirement period. This figure is double the amount advised to previous generations.

Next problem arising can be the employer-sponsored retirement plans that represent the biggest possibility of retirement income after social security. The NIRS (National Institute for Retirement Security) found out that from the two-thirds of Millennials working for companies and employers offering any type of retirement plan, only half of them (one-third altogether) actually take part. This is caused by the fact that from the two-thirds mentioned only about a half of them are in fact eligible to participate in an employer-sponsored retirement plan, which is far lower proportion compared to previous generations (GenX, Boomers). One of the possible solutions of this particular problem could be shortening of the waiting period for employees to become eligible to reach those plans. Auto-enrollment into the retirement plans for employees with an option to adjust or exit the can also lead to improvement.

Better education, regarding personal finance, retirement savings, pension plans and investing, could represent another way of improving retirement security. Recent OECD's study cites that less than a quarter of working Americans regard themselves to be "knowledgeable investors" , furthermore this number can be even lower in reality, because from the OECD's study on financial education emerged, that people often can not fully assess their financial skills and tend to overrate their knowledge in this particular area. Another finding out was general impression among people that financial information is very intricate and even difficult to find. Better knowledge and education about financial matters results in more profound awareness of retirement security and can eventually enhance future investment and retirement planning.

See also
 History of retirement
 Economic inequality
 Economic classes

External links

Retirement economic issues
 How to survive the coming retirement crisis, By Allison Schrager, December 30, 2019, quartz.com
 A world without retirement.The population is getting older and the welfare state can no longer keep up. After two months talking to people in Britain about retirement, it's clear that old age is an increasingly scary prospect. by Amelia Hill.
  'There's a danger of a generation who can't afford to retire'.Is the idea of a financially comfortable retirement increasingly unattainable – and are we being honest about how much we need to save? by Amelia Hill.
 This Is What Life Without Retirement Savings Looks Like.  Many seniors are stuck with lives of never-ending work—a fate that could befall millions in the coming decades. by Alana Semuels. February 22, 2018
 For American Workers, 4 Key Retirement Issues to Watch in 2019. NY Times, Dec 2018.

Articles on generational economic issues

Social Security issues
 Don't Cut Social Security—Double It by Steven Hill. December 12, 2012.
 The Real Problem With Social Security. by Brad McMillan.
 Social Security Is Staring at Its First Real Shortfall in Decades. By Jeff Sommer, June 12, 2019. A slow-moving crisis is approaching for Social Security, threatening to undermine a central pillar in the retirement of tens of millions of Americans. Next year, for the first time since 1982, the program must start drawing down its assets in order to pay retirees all of the benefits they have been promised, according to the latest government projections. Unless a political solution is reached, Social Security's so-called trust funds are expected to be depleted within about 15 years. Then, something that has been unimaginable for decades would be required under current law: Benefit checks for retirees would be cut by about 20 percent across the board.

Articles on government programs and proposals
 When Millions Can't Afford to Retire, the U.S. Needs a Better Option. When tens of millions of people all have the same problem, it's not a failure of individual initiative. July 11, 2019. Ganesh Sitaraman, Anne L. Alstott. "What we propose is a new, supplemental pension—in addition to Social Security—that is federally administered, open to everyone, and simple and safe to join. It would follow workers even if they change jobs, and it would last for life. Our public option wouldn't solve the retirement crisis on its own, but it would offer participants a more secure future."
 The Federal Government Gave Up on Retirement Security. As companies shortchange employees with pensions, Treasury and Labor look the other way. March 30, 2019. Joshua Gotbaum.
 Solving America's retirement security challenges. Thu, May 31, 2018. Republican Congressman Tim Walberg of Michigan.Congressman Tim Walberg's proposed Increasing Access to a Secure Retirement Act would outline a plan sponsor's fiduciary requirement when selecting an insurer of an annuity product. By clarifying rules surrounding annuity plans, Congress can broaden savings options available to employees across the country and give plan sponsors the assurance that they are making the best choice for their employees, said Walberg.
 Congress Must Act to Strengthen Americans’ Retirement Security. May 24, 2019. Report by US House of Representatives Budget Committee.
The Three-Legged Stool of Retirement is Broken
Americans have traditionally relied on three income streams to support themselves through retirement: employer-sponsored pensions, personal savings, and Social Security – the “three-legged stool.” While each leg was considered insufficient on its own, together the three would provide for economic security over the course of retired life. As our witnesses testified, however, these legs have become shaky over the last few decades:
Employer-sponsored pensions are largely a thing of the past, having been replaced by less secure 401(k)s and other “defined contribution” savings plans. Additionally, nearly 30 percent of workers do not have access to any kind of employer-sponsored retirement plan, while only 55 percent of those who do have access end up participating.
Personal savings are meager following decades of wage stagnation, coupled with the rising cost of essentials like health care. Most families have also struggled to make up for the earnings and savings lost during the Great Recession.
Social Security plays an increasingly crucial role in supporting retirees and single-handedly keeps millions of seniors out of poverty each year. The increased reliance on Social Security comes as the program faces a long-run funding shortfall, which makes it all the more important to ensure that Social Security continues to provide future generations with adequate retirement security.
These shifts have spurred greater retirement insecurity among many American workers, at a time when longer lifespans are increasing the amount of resources they will need to sustain themselves through retirement.

References

Retirement
Ageing
Economic inequality
Government aid programs
Private aid programs